AAOD may refer to:

 Ancient Archaeological Order of Druids, see Druidry (modern)#Druidry in North America
 Australian Age of Dinosaurs, a not for profit organisation